Abrar Ahmed (born 31 July 1971) is an Indian former cricketer. He played six first-class matches for Hyderabad between 1990 and 1991.

See also
 List of Hyderabad cricketers

References

External links
 

1971 births
Living people
Indian cricketers
Hyderabad cricketers
Cricketers from Hyderabad, India